Sacu is a commune in Caraș-Severin County, western Romania with a population of 1681 people. It is composed of three villages: Sacu, Sălbăgelu Nou (Gyulatelep) and Tincova (Tinkova).

References

Communes in Caraș-Severin County
Localities in Romanian Banat